KFLP (900 AM) is a radio station licensed to Floydada, Texas, United States. The station serves the Lubbock area. It originates programming from studios in Lubbock, TX and Floydada, TX. Station is currently owned by Anthony L. Ricketts. It broadcasts agribusiness news, markets, and weather reports. It is the flagship station for the All Ag Radio Network. Syndicated programs developed by the All Ag Network including Agriculture Today, the Agribusiness Report, Growing Cotton, American Cattle News, and the Ag News Update.

History
The station went on-air as 'KFLD' on April 1, 1951. This call sign remained until 1972, when it was again changed to 'KFLP' and then to 'KFBA', on July 9, 1980. On January 28, 1985, it changed call signs yet-again to 'KKAP', then on June 6, 1992, to 'KAWA'. On March 22, 1996, it was reverted to the 1972 call sign 'KFLP', which is the current call sign.

References

External links
Paramount Broadcasting Website

FLP
Radio stations established in 1951
1951 establishments in Texas